Leuconitocris is a genus of longhorn beetles of the subfamily Lamiinae, containing the following species:

subgenus Cicatronitocris
 Leuconitocris argyrostigma (Aurivillius, 1914)
 Leuconitocris aurigutticollis (Téocchi, 1998)
 Leuconitocris delecta (Gahan, 1909)
 Leuconitocris kafakumbae (Breuning, 1950)
 Leuconitocris senegalensis (Audinet-Serville, 1835)
 Leuconitocris singularis (Téocchi, 1994)
 Leuconitocris tanganjyicae (Breuning, 1956)

subgenus Leuconitocris
 Leuconitocris chrysostigma (Harold, 1878)
 Leuconitocris leucostigma (Harold, 1878)

subgenus Nitakeris
 Leuconitocris acutipennis (Breuning, 1956)
 Leuconitocris adorata (Thomson, 1858)
 Leuconitocris angustifrons (Harold, 1878)
 Leuconitocris argenteovittata (Aurivillius, 1914)
 Leuconitocris atriceps (Breuning, 1956)
 Leuconitocris atricornis (Breuning, 1950)
 Leuconitocris basilewskyi (Breuning, 1955)
 Leuconitocris bicoloricornis (Breuning, 1965)
 Leuconitocris bifasciata (Aurivillius, 1927)
 Leuconitocris bimaculata (Franz, 1942)
 Leuconitocris buettneri (Kolbe, 1893)
 Leuconitocris calabarica (Breuning, 1956)
 Leuconitocris dimidiaticornis (Chevrolat, 1857)
 Leuconitocris flavipennis (Breuning, 1956)
 Leuconitocris flavotibialis (Breuning, 1956)
 Leuconitocris fuscofasciata (Breuning & Téocchi, 1978)
 Leuconitocris fuscosternalis (Breuning, 1950)
 Leuconitocris gigantea (Nonfried, 1892)
 Leuconitocris gracilior (Breuning, 1956)
 Leuconitocris guineensis (Breuning, 1956)
 Leuconitocris hintzi (Aurivillius, 1923)
 Leuconitocris imitans (Breuning, 1956)
 Leuconitocris juvenca (Brancsik, 1914)
 Leuconitocris lualabae (Aurivillius, 1914)
 Leuconitocris lucasii (Thomson, 1858)
 Leuconitocris major (Breuning, 1956)
 Leuconitocris microphthalma (Breuning, 1950)
 Leuconitocris minor (Breuning, 1956)
 Leuconitocris murphyi (Sudre & Téocchi, 2005)
 Leuconitocris nigriceps (Aurivillius, 1914)
 Leuconitocris nigricollis (Aurivillius, 1914)
 Leuconitocris nigricornis (Olivier, 1795)
 Leuconitocris nigrofasciata (Aurivillius, 1925)
 Leuconitocris obereoides (Breuning, 1956)
 Leuconitocris occidentalis (Breuning, 1956)
 Leuconitocris parahintzi (Breuning & Téocchi, 1978)
 Leuconitocris pascoei (Thomson, 1858)
 Leuconitocris patricia (Chevrolat, 1858)
 Leuconitocris plagiata (Aurivillius, 1914)
 Leuconitocris pseudolucasi (Breuning, 1956)
 Leuconitocris pseudonigriceps (Breuning, 1950)
 Leuconitocris pseudoschultzei (Breuning, 1950)  
 Leuconitocris rufoantennalis (Breuning, 1950)
 Leuconitocris rufomedioantennalis (Breuning, 1964)
 Leuconitocris sanguinicollis (Breuning, 1956)
 Leuconitocris schoutedeni (Breuning, 1951)
 Leuconitocris schultzei (Hintz, 1919)
 Leuconitocris sessensis (Breuning, 1956)
 Leuconitocris similis (Gahan, 1894)
 Leuconitocris simpsoni (Aurivillius, 1914)
 Leuconitocris subjuvenca (Breuning, 1950)
 Leuconitocris tibialis (Kolbe, 1893)
 Leuconitocris togoensis (Breuning, 1961)
 Leuconitocris uniformis (Breuning, 1950)

References

Saperdini